
The Ångerman or Angerman is one of Sweden's longest rivers with a total length of . It also has the third largest flow rate, after the Göta and Lule.

Name
The name was formerly written Ångermann or Angermann. The name is derived from the Old Norse anger, which means "deep fjord" and appear as such in placenames in Norway and as "ånger" in placenames along the coast of Norrland.

Course
It starts in the Scandinavian mountain range in the southern parts of the Swedish province of Lapland. It then trails through Jämtland, increasing in power in the province of Ångermanland, whose name derives from it.  The Vojmån, Fjällsjö, and Fax are its main tributaries. It contains an internal bifurcation Vängelälven.

Over the last  (after the town of Sollefteå noted on the map), it flows through a scenic valley known as Ådalen. The Ångerman then empties into the Baltic Sea's Gulf of Bothnia near the town of Kramfors.

References

Citations

Bibliography
 .
 .  
 . 

Rivers of Jämtland County
Ångermanland
Drainage basins of the Baltic Sea
Rivers of Västernorrland County
River bifurcations